Julia Jones (born January 23, 1981) is an American actress, known for playing Leah Clearwater in The Twilight Saga films and Kohana in the HBO series Westworld. She also co-stars on Dexter: New Blood.

Early life and education
Julia Jones was born in Boston, Massachusetts to Frank Jones and Penny Wells. She has a younger brother named Cody. She has stated that her mother is of English descent, and that her father "is part Choctaw, Chickasaw, and African-American". She was raised in the Jamaica Plain neighborhood of Boston, and frequented the first JP Licks ice cream store, which was close to her home. Jones studied at the Boston Ballet School from the age of 4. She began working in commercials and local theatre when she was eight. In 1999, Jones graduated from the historic Boston Latin School, the oldest public school in the United States. She subsequently attended Columbia University where she earned her bachelor's degree in English in 2005.

Career
Jones has modeled in catalogues for Levi Strauss & Co., Gap Inc., Esprit Holdings, and L'Oréal. She appeared in Chuck Wicks's music video for "Hold That Thought".

Jones appeared in a number of independent films before being cast in the Quentin Tarantino-produced biker remake Hell Ride, which premiered at Sundance in 2008. She played Dr. Kaya Montoya on ER in its final two seasons. In 2009, she appeared in the Culture Clash play Palestine, New Mexico, at the Mark Taper Forum in Los Angeles.

In 2010, Jones was cast in Jonah Hex and in the last three installments of The Twilight Saga. In 2015, she played the female lead opposite Adam Sandler in The Ridiculous 6 and Gab on the Netflix series Longmire. She guest-starred on the 2019 Disney+ series The Mandalorian in the episode "Chapter 4: Sanctuary".

Filmography

Film

Television

Awards

 (2004) FAITA Award for Best Actress for Black Cloud

References

External links

 

21st-century American actresses
Actresses from Massachusetts
American film actresses
American television actresses
American people who self-identify as being of Native American descent
Actresses from Boston
Boston Latin School alumni
Columbia College (New York) alumni
Living people
African-American actresses
21st-century African-American women
20th-century African-American women
20th-century African-American people
1981 births